Herbert Bachnick (9 February 1920 – 7 August 1944) was a World War II flying ace in the Luftwaffe (German Air Force) credited with 80 aerial victories—that is, 80 aerial combat encounters resulting in the destruction of the enemy aircraft, all but one over the Eastern Front. He was also a recipient of the Knight's Cross of the Iron Cross. The Knight's Cross of the Iron Cross was awarded to recognise extreme battlefield bravery or successful military leadership.

Career

Bachnick was born on 9 February 1920 in Mannheim in the Republic of Baden. Following flight training, he was posted to 9. Staffel (9th squadron), also known as the Karaya-Staffel, of Jagdgeschwader 52 (JG 52–52nd Fighter Wing) on 5 December 1942 serving on the Eastern Front. At the time, 9. Staffel was commanded by Hauptmann Ernst Ehrenberg and was subordinated to III. Gruppe (3rd group) of JG 52 headed by Major Hubertus von Bonin.

Bachnik claimed his first three aerial victories on 5 July 1943 and had by August claimed 14 victories. By late September his victory total was 31, and by the end of 1943 had 47 victories credited. On 7 January 1944 he claimed five Il-2 Sturmovik aircraft shot down. He claimed 27 victories in March.

On 7 January 1944, Bachnick became an "ace-in-a-day" for the first time when shot down five Soviet aircraft. In April, Unteroffizier Bachnick was transferred to 2. Staffel of Ergänzungs-Jagdgruppe Ost as an instructor. He was promoted to Leutnant in May. Bachnick was wounded in combat with United States Army Air Forces (USAAF) bombers and fighters on 7 July force landing his Messerschmitt Bf 109 G-6 near Moran. He was awarded the Knight's Cross of the Iron Cross on 27 July for 78 aerial victories.

Bachnick returned to 9. Staffel of JG 52 following three months as an instructor. On 7 August 1944, he engaged a USAAF formation and shot down a North American P-51 Mustang. However, his Bf 109 G-6 (Werknummer 166065—factory number) "Yellow 4" was damaged in the encounter. Bachnick attempted a forced landing near Myslowitz but crashed into a railroad embarkment, killing him.

Summary of career

Aerial victory claims
According to Spick, Bachnick was credited with 80 aerial victories, including one four-engined bomber, claimed in 373 combat missions. Obermaier lists Bachnick with 80 aerial victories, 79 of which on the Eastern Front, claimed in 373 combat mission. Mathews and Foreman, authors of Luftwaffe Aces — Biographies and Victory Claims, researched the German Federal Archives and found records for 78 aerial victory claims, plus one further unconfirmed claim, all of which claimed on the Eastern Front.

Victory claims were logged to a map-reference (PQ = Planquadrat), for example "PQ 35 Ost 62773". These sectors were then subdivided into 36 smaller units to give a location area 3 × 4 km in size.

Awards
 Pilots Badge
 Front Flying Clasp of the Luftwaffe for Fighter Pilots in Gold (31 July 1943)
 Iron Cross (1939)
 2nd Class (6 August 1943)
 1st Class (7 September 1943)
 Honour Goblet of the Luftwaffe (Ehrenpokal der Luftwaffe) on 13 December 1943 as Feldwebel and pilot
 German Cross in Gold on 5 February 1944 as Feldwebel in the 9./Jagdgeschwader 52
 Knight's Cross of the Iron Cross on 27 July 1944 as Fahnenjunker-Feldwebel and pilot in the 9./Jagdgeschwader 52

Notes

References

Citations

Bibliography

 
 
 
 
 
 
 
 
 
 
 
 
 
 
 
 

German World War II flying aces
Recipients of the Gold German Cross
Recipients of the Knight's Cross of the Iron Cross
Aviators killed by being shot down
Luftwaffe personnel killed in World War II
1944 deaths
1920 births
Military personnel from Mannheim